Joseph Andrew Bart (born December 15, 1996) is an American professional baseball catcher for the San Francisco Giants of Major League Baseball (MLB). Bart played college baseball for the Georgia Tech Yellow Jackets. The Giants chose him with the second overall pick of the 2018 MLB draft. He made his MLB debut in 2020.

Amateur career
Bart attended Buford High School in Buford, Georgia. He became the starting catcher for the school's baseball team in his freshman year. He had a .556 on-base percentage and a .859 slugging percentage in his junior year, but was pitched around by opposing teams in his senior year, decreasing his performance. Buford HS won the Georgia Class 4A State Championship his senior year going 34-2 and finishing ranked as 8th in the MaxPreps National Poll. The Tampa Bay Rays selected Bart in the 27th round of the 2015 MLB draft, but he opted not to sign.

Bart enrolled at the Georgia Institute of Technology to play college baseball for the Georgia Tech Yellow Jackets and majored in business administration. After his freshman year in 2016, he played collegiate summer baseball with the Wareham Gatemen of the Cape Cod Baseball League (CCBL), where he was named a league all-star. He was named to the Johnny Bench Award watch list in his sophomore year, but he missed the last 11 games of his sophomore season with a broken finger. Following his sophomore season, he played for the United States national collegiate baseball team, and returned to the CCBL to play with the Harwich Mariners.

In 2018, his junior year, Bart had a .359 batting average, the best in the Atlantic Coast Conference (ACC), a .632 slugging percentage, the second-highest in the ACC, and a .471 on base percentage, third-highest in the conference, along with 16 triples (5th) and 55 runs (9th). He was named to the Golden Spikes Award watch list, and was named the Atlantic Coast Conference's Baseball Player of the Year. Bart also won the Johnny Bench Award.

Minor leagues
Considered a top prospect in the 2018 MLB draft, the San Francisco Giants selected Bart with the second overall pick. He signed with the Giants for $7,025,000, the largest signing bonus ever for a position player.

Due to the layoff following the college season, the Giants sent Bart to their Scottsdale, Arizona, facility, before assigning him to the Salem-Keizer Volcanoes of the Class A-Short Season Northwest League. In 45 games and 181 at bats for Salem-Keizer, Bart slashed .298/.369/.613 (leading the Northwest League) with 13 home runs (3rd) and 39 RBIs (5th), as he also was second in the league with 9 hit-by-pitch. He was named an NWL mid-season All Star, a NWL post-season All Star, a Baseball America Short-Season All Star, and a 2018 MiLB.com Organization All Star.

The Giants invited Bart to spring training as a non-roster player in 2019. Bart began the 2019 season with the San Jose Giants of the Class A-Advanced California League. He broke his hand on a hit by pitch on April 15 and was on the injured list until June 4. Bart was named to the 2019 All-Star Futures Game. In August, the Giants promoted Bart to the Richmond Flying Squirrels of the Class AA Eastern League, with whom he finished the year. Over 79 games and 313 at bats between the two clubs, Bart slashed .278/.328/.495 with 16 home runs and 48 RBIs. He played in the Arizona Fall League for the Scottsdale Scorpions following the season, for whom he batted .333 (7th in the league)/.524 (leading the league)/.767 (leading the league) with four home runs (2nd) and 10 RBIs in 30 at bats, and was named a "Rising Star". He was named a 2019 MiLB.com Organization All Star.

The Giants again invited Bart to spring training in 2020.

Major leagues

2020
On August 20, Bart was promoted to the major leagues. He made his debut that night against the Los Angeles Angels and got his first career hit, a double, off of Julio Teherán. Bart recorded an extra-base hit in each of his first three career games, only the third Giants player to do so since at least 1901. He finished the season slashing .233/.288/.320 in 33 games.

2021
On May 4, 2021, Bart was called back up to the majors from one of the Giants alternate training sites. He had one at bat as a PH in the Giants' second game of the double header against the Rockies. Two days later, Bart was optioned to AAA Sacramento to start the Triple-A season. On July 10, due to the hand injury of Buster Posey, the Giants called Bart up again after he was hitting over .335 with an OPS of over .980. Bart hit seventh and caught Anthony DeSclafani while going 2-5 with two singles and an RBI. The following day, Bart was optioned back down to Triple-A Sacramento due to the MLB All-Star break.

2022
Bart began the 2022 season with San Francisco, but scuffled in his brief look and was optioned down to Triple-A Sacramento on June 8, after the Giants traded for Austin Wynns.

References

External links

1996 births
Living people
All-American college baseball players
Arizona League Giants players
Baseball players from Georgia (U.S. state)
Georgia Tech Yellow Jackets baseball players
Harwich Mariners players
Major League Baseball catchers
People from Buford, Georgia
Richmond Flying Squirrels players
Salem-Keizer Volcanoes players
San Francisco Giants players
San Jose Giants players
Scottsdale Scorpions players
Sportspeople from the Atlanta metropolitan area
Wareham Gatemen players